The 2017 Miami Dolphins season was the franchise's 48th season in the National Football League, the 52nd overall and the second under head coach Adam Gase. The team came off from a 10-6 record and a playoff appearance for the first time since 2008. They were seen as potential playoff contenders and looked to make consecutive playoff seasons for the first time since the 2000 and 2001 seasons. However, the team was affected by the loss of starting quarterback Ryan Tannehill, who tore his ACL during practice and was ruled out for the season. The team turned to former Bears quarterback Jay Cutler, who came out of retirement to become Tannehill's replacement and team's starter. After Tannehill got injured, coach Adam Gase called former Denver Broncos quarterback Peyton Manning about possibly coming out of retirement and taking Tannehill's place. However Manning later declined the idea of coming out of retirement. Gase was the QB coach and offensive coordinator of Peyton's Broncos between the 2012 and 2014 seasons. Additionally, the Dolphins were also one of the teams Peyton considered signing with following his release by the Colts in 2012. Later during the season, the team traded starting running back Jay Ajayi to the eventual champion Philadelphia Eagles in exchange for a 2018 fourth round draft pick on October 31.

The team's Week 1 game against the Buccaneers was rescheduled to November 19 due to Hurricane Irma. Week 11 was originally the two teams' bye week. Week 1 would become the bye week for both teams and they would not play until Week 2. This was first time since the Arizona Cardinals in 2001 in which a team had a bye week in Week 1.

The Dolphins struggled during the season and failed to improve on the previous season's record after losing to the Patriots on Week 12 and were eliminated from the postseason after losing to the Chiefs in Week 16. They finished with a reverse record from the previous year, going 6–10. This was the Dolphins's fourteenth season missing the playoffs since the league's realignment in 2002.

Roster changes

Trades

Free agents

Signings

Unrestricted

Restricted

Exclusive rights

Departures

Draft

Notes
The team traded their third- and fourth-round selections as well as their sixth-round selection in 2016 (186th) to Minnesota in exchange for Minnesota's third-round selection in 2016 (86th). If Miami receives a fourth-round compensatory selection, that pick will go to Minnesota. If they do not receive a compensatory selection, Minnesota will receive Miami's original fourth-round selection.
 The Dolphins were awarded three compensatory picks by the NFL, one in the third round (97th) and two in the fifth (178th and 184th).

Undrafted free agents

Staff

Final roster

Preseason

Regular season

Schedule
On December 13, 2016, the NFL announced that the Dolphins would play host to the New Orleans Saints as one of the NFL London Games at Wembley Stadium. The game occurred during Week 4 (Sunday, October 1), and was televised in the United States.

The remainder of the Dolphins'  schedule was finalized and announced on April 20. 

Note: Intra-division opponents are in bold text.

Game summaries

Week 2: at Los Angeles Chargers

After their week 1 game was postponed due to Hurricane Irma, the Dolphins traveled out to LA to face the new Los Angeles Chargers, where they won 19–17 to start the season at 1–0. It was also the Dolphins' first road win over the Chargers since 2005.

Week 3: at New York Jets

Week 4: vs. New Orleans Saints
NFL London Games

Week 5: vs. Tennessee Titans

Due to the delayed game of week one, this ended up being the first home game for the Dolphins in the regular season.

Week 6: at Atlanta Falcons
This was the Dolphins' first win in Atlanta since 1980, during the Don Shula era.

Week 7: vs. New York Jets

Week 8: at Baltimore Ravens

Week 9: vs. Oakland Raiders

Week 10: at Carolina Panthers

Week 11: vs. Tampa Bay Buccaneers

In a game that was originally going to be played in week 1, but got moved due to Hurricane Irma, the Buccaneers won 30–20 thanks to three Jay Cutler interceptions

Week 12: at New England Patriots

Week 13: vs. Denver Broncos

Week 14: vs. New England Patriots

Week 15: at Buffalo Bills

Week 16: at Kansas City Chiefs

Week 17: vs. Buffalo Bills

This game marked the end of Jay Cutler's, Jarvis Landry's, Ndamukong Suh's, and Mike Pouncey's tenure in Miami. Landry was ejected from the game after instigating a fight following a fourth-quarter touchdown reception.

Standings

Division

Conference

Notes

References

External links
 

Miami
Miami Dolphins seasons
Miami Dolphins